Marco Crugnola and Rubén Ramírez Hidalgo were the defending champions but decided not to participate.
Marin Draganja and Lovro Zovko won the title, defeating Colin Ebelthite and Jaroslav Pospíšil 6–1, 6–1 in the final.

Seeds

Draw

Draw

References
 Main Draw

Banja Luka Challenger - Doubles
2012 Doubles